St. Andrew's Playground is a small park in downtown Toronto. It is located at the 450 Adelaide Street West, at the northwest corner of Brant St and Adelaide. It has a playground for children and an off-leash area for dogs that is surrounded by a short fence, with an accessible water fountain for pets, children, and adults. A Heritage Toronto plaque in the northwest corner describing the history and significance of the park was installed in 2007.

History 

In 1834 the land was planned as a square under the 'New Town Extension' and in 1837, this city block was set aside for a public market, the third of its kind after the St. Lawrence Market and the St. Patrick's Market. The market was built in 1850 and named "St. Andrew's Market" after its city ward. It served as an important commercial centre for what was then Toronto's west end.

A fire in 1860 destroyed the first market buildings. They were replaced in 1873 by the much larger St. Andrew's Hall and Market, designed in Renaissance Revival style. The building housed a police station, a community hall, a public library branch, as well as the market sellers of fresh produce and butchers.

In the 1870s, St. Andrew's Market began to lose some of its relevance as a commercial hub. In 1889, an addition was added, however by 1900 the market stalls were mostly empty. The buildings were demolished in 1932, and replaced by a water works building (housing offices, warehouse and workshops) designed by City Architect James John Woolnough.

The southern section of the Market was used as a public park since the 1880s, becoming "St. Andrew's Playground" in 1909, "the first City of Toronto property dedicated to, and equipped for, supervised children's play."

In 2009, the St. Andrews Market was partly revived through a weekly outdoor farmers' market operated by Farmers’ Markets Ontario which occurred on Saturday mornings from early June to late October at Adelaide and Maud Streets, in a parking lot alongside the park. However, due to low attendance and resulting lack of vendor interest, the market did not return the following year.

The Waterworks building is currently in the process of being redeveloped into a mixed-use residential, commercial and public building. Most of the existing building will be repurposed into retail food hall and other uses (YMCA), and 13 floors of apartments are to be built above. The Waterworks building is a registered heritage building. It is an example of an Art Deco inspired building. As part of the redevelopment, the building site has been sold to a private developer.

See also
St. Lawrence Market
St. Patrick's Market

References

External links
 Heritage Toronto

Parks in Toronto
Farmers' markets in Ontario
1850 establishments in Canada